U.S. Route 271 (US 271, US-271) is a north–south United States highway.  Never a long highway, it went from bi-state route (Arkansas and Oklahoma) to a tri-state route (Arkansas, Oklahoma and Texas). Its southern terminus is in Tyler, Texas, at an intersection with State Highway 31 and SH 155. The highway's northern terminus is in Fort Smith, Arkansas, at an intersection with Business U.S. Route 71 and Highway 255.  It enters Arkansas from Oklahoma as a controlled-access highway, but the highway continues as Interstate 540 when US 271 exits toward downtown after  in Arkansas.

Route description

Texas

US 271 begins in Tyler at an intersection with SH 31  (Front Street)  and SH 155, and thus runs northward concurrent with SH 155.  At 1 mile, there is an intersection with Spur 147 which runs across the north side of the city to connect with Broadway and then US 69.

At 3.2 miles is the intersection with Loop 323.  The site of Camp Ford, a Confederate POW camp during the Civil War, is encompassed by a former TxDOT picnic area now maintained by Smith County at this junction.  The SH 155 concurrency ends at 8 miles, near the University of Texas Health Science Center at Tyler.  SH 155 goes to Gilmer via Winona and Big Sandy.  The easier route between Tyler and Gilmer is US 271.

At 12.7 miles is the interchange with Interstate 20, signed for Dallas  (west)  and Longview  (east).  North of the interstate, US 271 passes through Gladewater where there are junctions with SH 135 and US 80.  Trucks are required to use Loop 485, a bypass around the east side of town, if they are following US 271 through the area or if they want to turn onto US 80.

North of Gladewater, US 271 passes through Gilmer, where there are junctions with SH 300 and SH 154.  There is also another concurrency  (only 1.5 miles)  with SH 155 which then veers to the northeast toward Linden.  North of Gilmer is Pittsburg, where US 271 intersects with SH 11.  Then the highway crosses Big Cypress Creek just below the dam that forms Lake Bob Sandlin.  In Mount Pleasant, there are junctions with SH 49 and US 67 and then the interchange with Interstate 30.  Beyond IH 30 are the small towns of Talco, Bogata  (junction with SH 37), Deport, and Pattonville.

In Paris, US 271 runs concurrently with Loop 286 and US 82 around the east and northeast sides of the city.  After splitting northward from the loop, US 271 is a four-lane divided highway into Oklahoma, crossing the Red River 15 miles north of Paris and 10 miles south of Hugo.

Oklahoma
North of the Red River, US 271 continues as a four-lane highway. The Choctaw Nation operates a casino on the west side of the highway where US 271 is concurrent with SH 109. North of the junction with SH 109 west is the intersection with SH 271A, the only lettered spur along US 271, which runs westward to the Goodland Academy.

From Hugo westward eight miles, US 271 runs in a concurrency with U.S. 70. The southern terminus of the Indian Nation Turnpike is an interchange on this concurrency. The ODOT roadside park at the west end of the concurrency is the only one on the entire route of US 271 in Oklahoma.

Northward, US 271 is a two-lane road. It goes under the turnpike without an interchange before entering Antlers, where there is a concurrency with SH 3 through town. Leaving Antlers, US 271 crosses the Kiamichi River. The road to Clayton is sinuous and scenic, passing through hilly woodlands. The route passes through the communities of Snow and Finley, followed by the western terminus of SH 144 before passing the Clayton Lake State Park and then crossing the Kiamichi again. There are weight limits of 15 tons (depending on vehicle length) posted between SH 144 and Clayton.

In Clayton, there is a concurrency with SH 2, which to the south is the better through travel route from Antlers. The town has a monument that indicates that the highway was built by convict labor in 1925. From Clayton, US 271 takes on an easterly trajectory, passing Tuskahoma and Albion, before turning northward prior to Talihina. In Talihina, there is a brief concurrency with SH 63. From Talihina eastward eight miles, US 271 runs concurrently with SH 1 until the beginning of the Talimena Scenic Drive. North and south of this intersection there are scenic overlooks. US 271 thus continues northward for another 15 miles to a T intersection with US 270, with which it runs concurrently for six miles into Wister. From Wister, US 271 runs northeasterly to Poteau. From Poteau via Panama to SH 9, the highway is co-signed with U.S. 59. Then, US 271 runs concurrently with SH 9 through Spiro to the Arkansas line near Pocola. Almost all of the route between Poteau and the state line is four-lane divided highway.

Arkansas
Its northern terminus is at Business U.S. 71 and Highway 255 in Fort Smith.

History
In 1926, US 271 was commissioned between Fort Smith, Arkansas, and Mena, Arkansas, by way of Spiro and Poteau, Oklahoma, but the route south of Poteau was turned over to U.S. Route 270 (and later, U.S. Route 59) in 1930.  US 271 was then re-routed through Talihina and Hugo, Oklahoma, as well as Paris and Tyler, Texas, towards  Beaumont near the Gulf of Mexico.  The Tyler-to-Beaumont leg was taken over by U.S. Route 69 in 1934.

US 271's original northern terminus was at an intersection with U.S. Route 64 and U.S. Route 71 in Fort Smith. It has since been realigned twice: once beginning at U.S. 71 and Y Street then crossing into Oklahoma at Arkoma, the second time to its current terminus in southern Fort Smith. The Arkansas State Highway Commission ordered for US 271 to be extended along Highway 59 to the Missouri state line (pending AASHTO approval) in 1960. Approval was not given by the national organization.

Special routes

Major intersections

See also

Related routes
 U.S. Route 71
 U.S. Route 171
 U.S. Route 371

References

External links

Endpoints of US highway 271

71-2
71-2
71-2
71-2
2
Transportation in Smith County, Texas
Transportation in Gregg County, Texas
Transportation in Upshur County, Texas
Transportation in Camp County, Texas
Transportation in Titus County, Texas
Transportation in Franklin County, Texas
Transportation in Red River County, Texas
Transportation in Lamar County, Texas
Transportation in Choctaw County, Oklahoma
Transportation in Pushmataha County, Oklahoma
Transportation in Le Flore County, Oklahoma
Transportation in Sebastian County, Arkansas